Jan Žumer (born 9 June 1982 in Ljubljana) is a Slovenian athlete who specializes in the 100 metres, 200 metres and the long jump.

In the long jump he competed at the 2002 European Indoor Championships, the 2005 European Indoor Championships and the 2006 European Championships without reaching the final round. In the 100 metres he competed at the 2006 European Championships (semi-final) and the 2007 World Championships (quarter-final) without reaching the final round.

Competition record

Personal bests
60 metres - 6.68 s (2006, indoor)
100 metres - 10.21 s (2006)
200 metres - 20.59 s (2013)
Long jump - 8.07 m (2004, indoor), 8.00 (2006, outdoor)

References

1982 births
Living people
Slovenian male long jumpers
Slovenian male sprinters
Mediterranean Games bronze medalists for Slovenia
Mediterranean Games medalists in athletics
Athletes (track and field) at the 2005 Mediterranean Games
Athletes (track and field) at the 2009 Mediterranean Games